Chappaqua Suite is a free jazz album by alto saxophonist Ornette Coleman which was recorded in 1965 for Columbia Records.

It was originally commissioned by director Conrad Rooks as the soundtrack to his film Chappaqua; however, the music was not used in the released version of the film because Rooks decided upon hearing Coleman's music that its inherent beauty might detract from the force of the film.

Reception 

The AllMusic review by Thom Jurek stated: "While not considered a masterwork of Coleman's, perhaps because of its unavailability in the United States in its entirety, Chappaqua Suite is a testament to Coleman's vision as a composer and the power of his orchestral direction. Very worthwhile indeed". A writer for Eartrip magazine described the nature of Coleman's playing on the album: "the unfolding of ideas on a similar plane is not about building up to emotional climaxes, [...] but about the constant stream of ideas within particular parameters which are open to change but which are not under the force of having to change."

Track listing 
"Chappaqua Suite, Part 1" – 21:06
"Chappaqua Suite, Part 2" – 18:41
"Chappaqua Suite, Part 3" – 17:36
"Chappaqua Suite, Part 4" – 21:48
All compositions by Ornette Coleman

Personnel 
 Ornette Coleman – alto saxophone
 Pharoah Sanders – tenor saxophone
 David Izenzon – double bass
 Charles Moffett – drums
 Orchestra arranged by Joseph Tekula

References 

1966 albums
Columbia Records albums
Ornette Coleman albums
Free jazz albums
Albums produced by Henri Renaud